KFTU may refer to:

 KFTU-DT, a television station (channel 36) licensed to serve Douglas, Arizona, United States
 KFTU-CD, a low-power television station (channel 18) licensed to serve Tucson, Arizona, rebroadcasting KFTU-TV
 Kyrgyzstan Federation of Trade Unions, the national trade union center of Kyrgyzstan